Andreas Ludwig (born 11 September 1990) is a German footballer who plays as a winger for SSV Ulm in the Regionalliga Südwest.

In January 2014, Ludwig went out on loan to 2. Bundesliga side 1860 Munich.

References

External links
 
 

1991 births
Living people
German footballers
Association football midfielders
3. Liga players
Bundesliga players
2. Bundesliga players
Eredivisie players
Regionalliga players
SSV Ulm 1846 players
TSG 1899 Hoffenheim II players
TSG 1899 Hoffenheim players
1. FC Heidenheim players
TSV 1860 Munich players
VfR Aalen players
FC Utrecht players
1. FC Magdeburg players
German expatriate footballers
German expatriate sportspeople in the Netherlands
Expatriate footballers in the Netherlands
Sportspeople from Ulm
Footballers from Baden-Württemberg